William Detré was a Roman Catholic missionary, b. in France in 1668, d. in South America, at an advanced age, date uncertain. 

After his admission to the Society of Jesus, Detré was sent by his superiors to the missions of South America in 1706, and seven years later was appointed superior-general and visitor of all the missions of the Amazon, embracing a tract of over 3000 miles. He is credited with translating the Catechism into eighteen different languages for the various Indian tribes under his jurisdiction. It was he who sent to Europe the celebrated map of the Amazon drawn by Father Samuel Fritz, S.J., and engraved at Quito in 1707. In 1727 he was appointed rector of the College of Cuenca. His 1731 "Relation", describing his experiences with the indigenous tribes of the area, is included in Volume XXIII of the Lettres Edifiantes.

References

Attribution

1668 births
18th-century deaths
17th-century French Jesuits
18th-century French Jesuits
French Roman Catholic missionaries
Jesuit missionaries in Ecuador
French expatriates in Ecuador